The Independent Qualification Commission (KPK) is a constitutional entity directly responsible for the assessment and re-evaluation of judges, prosecutors, inspectors, legal advisors and other members of Albania's justice system.

The main duties of the KPK are as indicated in Article 179/b of the constitution: 

Headquartered in the former building of "The League of Writers and Artists" in Tirana, the Commission is chaired by the Chairperson and consists of 12 commissioners, organized into 4 panel judges composed of 3 members, who are selected by allotment.

References

Vetting institutions of Albania